The Society of Physics Students (SPS) is a professional association with international participation, granting membership through college chapters with the only requirement that the student member be interested in physics.  All college majors are welcome to join SPS, but the highest representation tends to come from majors in the natural sciences, engineering, and medicine.

National organization 

The SPS National Council and its Executive Committee decide the policies of SPS. The National Council is made up of 36 members, elected by chapters from one of 18 geographic zones. Each Zone represents a section of the country and is represented by a faculty Zone Councilor and a student Associate Councilor.  Both Councilors and Associate Councilors participate in zone activities and in the annual policy-making meeting of the Council. The SPS Executive Committee consists of the Presidents of the Society of Physics Students and Sigma Pi Sigma, the SPS National Office Director, the SPS/Sigma Pi Sigma Historian, an at-large member, a student representative, and the CEO of the American Institute of Physics. The director of the SPS National Office is Sean Bentley, a salaried physicist designated by AIP to administer the National Office's services and programs for SPS members. The Director is supported by additional National Office staff from the American Institute of Physics (AIP) Education Division.

Programs and Activities 

SPS strives to shape students into contributing members of the professional scientific community with the philosophy that since college courses only develop a particular range of skills in a student, it is important to develop other skills.

To promote these goals, SPS allows students to take part in professional membership societies, receive peer-reviewed journals, present and publish research, obtain scholarships, and receive awards as incentives for excellent performance.  Further, SPS supports several publications, including the quarterly magazine The SPS Observer. and SPS members stay involved with public science issues, education, and outreach.

Internships 
SPS administers an Internship Program, which offers select SPS members broad based learning opportunities with various organizations in science policy, communication, physics outreach, and scientific research for 9.5 weeks in Washington D.C.

The Society of Physics Students (SPS) and Sigma Pi Sigma is a partner in the AIP Career Network, a collection of online job sites for scientists, engineers, and computing professionals.

Publications 
SPS and Sigma Pi Sigma, the physics honor society, publish several resources for students and alumni, including the quarterly SPS Observer and the online Journal of Undergraduate Research in Physics.

Radiations Magazine is published by Sigma Pi Sigma twice a year in print.

References

External links
SPS National Website
Adopt a Physicist
SPS U.Platt. National Award
ACU SPS Award
SPS observer
JURP
SPS Jobs
Radiations Magazine

Student societies in the United States
Physics societies